Gilbert Morton (14 October 1881 – 28 January 1936) was an Australian cricketer. He played in four first-class matches for Queensland between 1904 and 1906.

See also
 List of Queensland first-class cricketers

References

External links
 

1881 births
1936 deaths
Australian cricketers
Queensland cricketers
People from Maryborough, Queensland
Cricketers from Queensland